The year 1955 in archaeology involved some significant events.

Explorations
 Thor Heyerdahl organizes the Norwegian Archaeological Expedition to Easter Island (continues to 1956).
 Start of extensive discoveries at the Anglo-Saxon cemetery on Loveden Hill in Lincolnshire, England.

Excavations
 September - Gustav Riek begins systematic excavations at Brillenhöhle (continues to 1963).
 A. C. O'Dell begins excavations on St Ninian's Isle (continues to 1958).
 Alexander Sahinian begins excavations at Etchmiadzin Cathedral in Armenia (continues to 1956).
 A. Ledyard Smith makes the first archaeological investigation of the Mayan site of Chutixtiox in Guatemala.
 Archaeological Survey of India begins excavations at Nagda chalcolithic site (continues to 1957).
 A Hebrew University team led by Yigal Yadin begins excavations at Tel Hazor (continues to 1958).
 Excavation of Qujialing culture type site in China begins (continues to 1957).

Publications
 Cyril Fox - Offa's Dyke: a Field Survey of the Western Frontier Works of Mercia in the Seventh and Eighth Centuries AD.
 Ivan D. Margary - Roman Roads in Britain, vol. 1.
 I. A. Richmond - Roman Britain (Penguin Books).

Finds
 May 19 - Greenock Coin Hoard in Scotland.
 Pesse canoe, the oldest known boat, in the Netherlands.
 First remains of Paranthropus boisei — teeth of Olduvai Hominin (OH) 3 — unearthed in Olduvai Gorge, Tanzania.

Awards

Miscellaneous
 October - The term "Industrial archaeology" is popularised.

Births
 January 1 - Mary Beard, English Classicist.
 April 20 - Svante Pääbo, Swedish paleogeneticist.
 September 30 - Martin Millett, English Classical archaeologist.

Deaths
 January 1 - Arthur C. Parker, part-Seneca American archaeologist and ethnographer of Native Americans in the United States (b. 1881).
 March 31 - Thomas Dunbabin, Australian-born Classical archaeologist and Greek Resistance leader (b. 1911).
 August 17 - Edward Thurlow Leeds, English archaeologist of the Anglo-Saxons (b. 1877).
 October 29 - Alexander Keiller, British archaeologist and benefactor (b. 1889).
 December 15 - V. E. Nash-Williams, Welsh archaeologist (b. 1897).
 December 25 - Thomas J. Preston, Jr., American archaeologist (b. 1862).

References

Archaeology
Archaeology
Archaeology by year